Trustpower Baypark Stadium (formerly known as ASB Baypark Stadium) is a multi-purpose stadium in Mount Maunganui, New Zealand. It is currently used for dirt track Speedway and jetsprints events during summer, and various other events throughout the year.

A $42 million multi-purpose facility, the Trustpower Arena, is situated next to the stadium.

The arena also has a cafe and provides catering services through the onsite caterer Bay Catering.

Facilities

Trustpower Arena 
Trustpower Arena is a multi-purpose venue in Tauranga, New Zealand which arrived to the area in 2011, providing versatile options for sports, business, leisure and entertainment events. The $42 million facility has hosted events from national sporting fixtures, trade shows and conferences, to gala dinners, corporate hospitality and international music acts.

Trustpower Stadium 
A roof over the south stand completed in 2011, means more than 90% of grandstand seating at the stadium is covered ensuring that fans can enjoy the event entertainment in the comfort of shelter whatever the weather.

Outdoor Area 
The Plaza, located at the eastern end of Trustpower Baypark, is a 700m2 courtyard.

A second sports field onsite at Trustpower Baypark provides additional turf for training and event requirements.

Activities 
The Trustpower Arena and Stadium play host to a range of events and activities making use of the various facilities available. With its proximity to Mount Maunganui and Tauranga city it is a very popular events destination in the Bay of Plenty.

Sports 
Trustpower Arena is capable of hosting a number of sporting events from professional level games right down to community sports leagues. The multi purpose courts are able to host indoor netball, indoor football, fastnet, volleyball and basketball games.

Conferences and meetings 
The Arena is able to host gatherings for 12 to 1,200 people.

Exhibitions and trade shows 

Various exhibitions and Trade Shows are held in the Arena each year in the 4500m² TECT Auditorium and the 2,349m² Lion Foundation Centre. In the past these have included the Tauranga Spring Home Show, the Seriously Good Food Show, Tauranga Career and Business Expo, Women's Lifestyle Expo, the Tauranga Wedding Show and an Active Retiree Expo.

Concerts 
Various concerts have been held at the Trustpower Arena in the past including performances from the Bryan Adams, Beach Boys, 10CC, Sol3 Mio and Savage. ASB Baypark has also played host to Bay Dreams, a festival held over New Years.

Baypark Speedway 
The Trustpower Stadium is home to speedway in Tauranga.

Transportation 
Located on the junction of major state highways, only minutes from the Tauranga Airport, Trustpower Baypark provides parking on site for up to 5,000 vehicles. It is within easy reach of the CBD, hotels, motels, shopping and entertainment. The region is linked by services to international airports in Rotorua, Hamilton and Auckland.

References

Rugby union stadiums in New Zealand
Speedway in New Zealand
Sport in Tauranga
Multi-purpose stadiums in New Zealand
Sports venues in the Bay of Plenty Region
2000s architecture in New Zealand